Nana is a German-language opera by Manfred Gurlitt to a libretto by Max Brod based on the novel Nana by Emile Zola. The opera was written 1931-1932, and due to be premiered in 1933, but cancelled because of Gurlitt's known opposition to the Nazi regime. It was not staged until 1958 in Dortmund, when the composer had long been in exile in Japan.

Recordings
Peter Schöne, Ilia Papandreou, Dario Süß, Julia Neumann, Opernchor Erfurt, Philharmonisches Orchester Erfurt, Enrico Calesso

References

1933 operas
German-language operas
Operas by Manfred Gurlitt
Operas
Operas based on novels